Bloody Pond is a  natural kettlehole pond in Plymouth, Massachusetts, near Long Pond village. The pond is located southeast of Long Pond. This pond, visible from the southbound side of Route 3 past the Ship Pond Road bridge, is fed by groundwater and has over two miles (3 km) of shoreline. Legal public access to the pond is obtained through a dirt road off of Long Pond Road and is suitable primarily for shore and wading fishermen as the access point is a long walk from a two-car parking lot in front of a gate.

The name "Bloody Pond" commemorates an Indian battle fought there.

References

External links
Mass Division of Fisheries and Wildlife - Pond Maps
Six Ponds Improvement Association

Ponds of Plymouth, Massachusetts
Ponds of Massachusetts